Oskar Schiele (April 14, 1889 – July 1, 1950) was a German freestyle and backstroke swimmer who competed in the 1906 Intercalated Games and in the 1912 Summer Olympics. He was born in Halberstadt and died in Magdeburg.

In 1906 he won a silver medal as a member of German 4x250 m relay team. He also finished seventh in the one mile freestyle competition. Six years later at the 1912 Olympics he was eliminated in the first round of the 400 metre freestyle event as well as of the 100 metre backstroke competition. He was also a member of the German relay team which finished fourth in the 4x200 metre freestyle relay event.

References

External links
 

1889 births
1950 deaths
German male swimmers
German male freestyle swimmers
Male backstroke swimmers
Olympic swimmers of Germany
Swimmers at the 1906 Intercalated Games
Swimmers at the 1912 Summer Olympics
Olympic silver medalists for Germany
Medalists at the 1906 Intercalated Games
People from Halberstadt
Sportspeople from Saxony-Anhalt